Burlington, New Jersey was incorporated on December 21, 1784. It is governed within the Faulkner Act (formally known as the Optional Municipal Charter Law) under the Mayor-Council form of municipal government (Plan 4), implemented based on the recommendations of a Charter Study Commission as of January 1, 1992. The governing body consists of a mayor and a seven-member Common Council, all elected on a partisan basis in a vote held as part of the November general election. The Mayor serves a four-year term of office. The Common Council consists of seven members, each serving four-year terms of office: three at-large Councilpersons representing the entire City and one representing each of the four voting wards, with the at||large and mayoral seats up for election as a group and the ward seats up for vote two years later.  The term for mayor runs from January 1 to December 31.

Mayors
Mayors are as follows:

References

 
Burlington